Sutton Peak is a mountain on Vancouver Island, British Columbia, Canada, located  northwest of Gold River and  west of Victoria Peak.

See also
 List of mountains in Canada

References

Vancouver Island Ranges
One-thousanders of British Columbia
Rupert Land District